Darleen is a first name, and may refer to:

 Darleen Carr, an American actress
 Darleen Druyun, a former United States Air Force official
 Darleen Ortega, an American judge
 Darleen Wilson, a musician and producer

See also 
 Darlene (disambiguation)

English given names